Dendrocometes is a genus of suctorian infusoria, characterized by the repeatedly branched attached body; each of the lobes of the body gives off a few retractile tentacles. It is parasitic on the gills of the so-called freshwater shrimp Gammarus pulex.

References 

Phyllopharyngea
Ciliate genera